The 2015 CWHL Draft was held on August 23, 2015. With the first pick overall, the Brampton Thunder selected Sarah Edney from the Harvard Crimson. Selecting second overall, the Toronto Furies picked Emily Fulton from the Cornell Big Red. Marie-Philip Poulin went third overall to the Montreal Stars, while the Calgary Inferno opted for Brianne Jenner. The defending Clarkson Cup champion Boston Blades had the fifth pick overall and selected Kristina Brown from Boston College.

Top 25 picks

See also
2010 CWHL Draft
2011 CWHL Draft
2012 CWHL Draft
2013 CWHL Draft
2014 CWHL Draft
2016 CWHL Draft

References

Draft
Canadian Women's Hockey League